It's Not Up to Us is the debut album by saxophonist/flautist Byard Lancaster released in 1968 on the Vortex label, an Atlantic subsidiary.

Reception

The AllMusic review by Michael G. Nastos called it "A rare recording". On All About Jazz, Jason Verhagen noted "Lancaster is a very important musical entity and also very unspoken – his work with Sun Ra, Philly Joe Jones, Sunny Murray, Larry Young and Fred Hopkins didn't exactly make him a superstar (he would often perform on Philadelphian street corners). ... Lancaster's "new jazz" movement, with the help of Sonny Sharrock on guitar, paved a way through the embrace of rock, folk and classical during the '70s". Pitchfork's Andy Beta stated "What strikes me first is the overall melodic sensibility of each of the players. Lancaster, on alto sax and flute, would go on to play with outsider luminaries like Sun Ra, Bill Dixon, and Fred Hopkins. Sharrock's violently strummed strings on Black Woman and Monkey-Pockie-Boo led to the vortices of Sonic Youth, Fugazi, and pretty much all future physical guitarists. Eric Gravatt would soon join an early version of Weather Report, yet everyone defers their skronkier, unrestrained abilities to the overall structure of each tune. This gives the Anglo folk base of some of Lancaster's compositions plenty room to be heard and hummed". In The Japan Times Tom Bojko wrote "There are several reasons to buy this re-release. The first, of course, is because it contains a wide range of outstanding music. From the jaunty, plaintive flute lines of the title track to the abstract rendition of "Over the Rainbow" and the aggressive guitar trills of the album's dark conclusion, "Satan," every note rings with honesty. The second reason is that it's an education in the evolution of studio tools as compositional devices. Here and there are deep washes of reverb, and Lancaster's horn occasionally surprises the ears by panning and fading. The effects are tasteful and subtle but – given the times – radical, nonetheless".

Track listing
All compositions by Byard Lancaster except as indicated
 "It's Not Up to Us" – 4:46
 "Last Summer" – 3:21
 "Misty" (Erroll Garner, Johnny Burke) – 4:59
 "John's Children" (Warren Sharrock) – 6:01
 "Mr. A.A." – 4:13
 "Dogtown" – 4:03
 "Over the Rainbow" (Harold Arlen, Yip Harburg) – 4:28
 "Satan" (Jerome Hunter, Lancaster, Sharrock) – 8:54

Personnel 
Byard Lancaster – alto saxophone, flute
Warren Sharrock – guitar
Jerome Hunter – bass, Fender bass
Eric Gravatt – drums
 Kenny Speller – congas

References 

1968 albums
Byard Lancaster albums
Vortex Records albums
Albums produced by Joel Dorn